Nigel M. Bell (born 2 December 1962), also known by the nicknames of "Belly", "Bell Boy" and "ol' Nige", is an English former professional rugby league footballer who played in the 1980s and 1990s. He played at club level for Eastmoor Dragons ARLFC (of the National Conference League/Pennine League/Yorkshire Men's League, in Eastmoor, Wakefield), and Wakefield Trinity (Heritage № 929) (captain), as a utility player, i.e. either in the backs, or forwards.

Background
Nigel Bell's birth was registered in Wakefield, West Riding of Yorkshire, England.

Playing career

County Cup Final appearances
Nigel Bell played  in Wakefield Trinity's 8–11 defeat by Castleford in the 1990 Yorkshire County Cup Final during the 1990–91 season at Elland Road, Leeds on Sunday 23 September 1990.

Club career
Nigel Bell made his début for Wakefield Trinity against at Leigh at Hilton Park, Leigh on Sunday 1 January 1984, he played his last match for Wakefield Trinity during 1996, he is ninth on the all-time Wakefield Trinity appearance list with 358 matches.

Genealogical information
Nigel Bell is the older brother of the rugby league footballer for Westgate Redoubt ARLFC and Bramley, Kevin Bell.

References

External links
Davies' pace makes for safe passage: Trinity outdone
Matchday Programme Cover - Warrington - Sunday 28 August 1988

1962 births
Living people
English rugby league players
Rugby league players from Wakefield
Rugby league utility players
Wakefield Trinity captains
Wakefield Trinity players